Disney's Lilo & Stitch is a 2002 side-scrolling platform video game developed by Digital Eclipse for the Game Boy Advance that is based on the Disney animated film of the same name. It was first released in North America on June 7, 2002 by Disney Interactive. Ubisoft distributed the game in Europe on October 4, 2002, and in Australia on March 24, 2005.

Gameplay
The game takes place at an unknown point of time after the original film. An extraterrestrial bounty hunter kidnaps Lilo (vocal effects by Daveigh Chase) and brings her aboard the spaceship laboratory of a robotic, mosquito-like alien named Dr. Pestus, who plans to use her as food for his genetically-modified mosquito army. Stitch (vocal effects by Chris Sanders) must go out into space to rescue Lilo and defeat Dr. Pestus. In most levels, the player takes control of a four-armed, plasma blaster-wielding Stitch who must run and gun his way past enemies and various other obstacles to complete the level. He can also acquire special ammunition for his plasma blasters that allow him to fire more powerful plasma blasts and can acquire pineapple bombs to throw at enemies. In a couple puzzle-platform-styled levels, the player takes control of Lilo as she sneaks around the spaceship to find a way to escape and contact Stitch. In a couple tube shooter-styled segments, Stitch must fly a spaceship to reach the next level, shooting down other enemy ships and dodging obstacles along the way.

Development
According to a 2023 interview with the game's director and present-day Digital Eclipse president Mike Mika, Digital Eclipse had developed so many licensed games for Disney and built up enough trust between them by close to Lilo & Stitch release that Disney Interactive "stopped paying attention to [Digital Eclipse]". When Disney Interactive commissioned Digital Eclipse for a Lilo & Stitch video game, the developers decided to make one inspired by SNK's Metal Slug series.

Upon seeing the game for themselves, executives at Disney Interactive were shocked at the level of violence and expressed concern that then-Disney CEO Michael Eisner would not approve of it. But there wasn't any time left by then to make changes, as Disney Interactive had to show their upcoming catalog the next day. However, Eisner ended up loving the game, much to the relief of both Disney Interactive and Digital Eclipse, who were called by the former Disney division after the meeting. Lilo & Stitch film directors Chris Sanders and Dean DeBlois also sent Digital Eclipse a signed poster thanking them for making the game.

The game also references other video games, including Gyruss and Oddworld: Abe's Oddysee.

Reception

Disney's Lilo & Stitch was met with mostly positive reviews, with critics favorably comparing the game to the Metal Slug series, but criticizing Stitch's inability to shoot while crawling or crouching and the game's use of a password save system. Critics also expressed concern that the game's high difficulty would frustrate its intended audience of young players. GameRankings and Metacritic gave the game aggregated review scores of 75.58% and 80 out of 100, respectively.

Sales
In the United States, the game sold 620,000 copies and earned $14 million by August 2006. During the period between January 2000 and August 2006, it was the 46th highest-selling game launched for the Game Boy Advance, Nintendo DS or PlayStation Portable in that country.

Sequel

In 2004, Disney Interactive released a standalone sequel developed by Climax Studios titled Lilo & Stitch 2: Hämsterviel Havoc, which is based on Lilo & Stitch: The Series.

References

External links

2002 video games
Disney video games
Lilo & Stitch (franchise) video games
Platform games
Shoot 'em ups
Game Boy Advance games
Game Boy Advance-only games
Science fiction video games
Single-player video games
Video games developed in the United States
Video games featuring female protagonists
Video games set in Hawaii
Video games set on fictional planets
Digital Eclipse games